Legal Framework Order refers to presidential decrees issued during military rule in Pakistan:
Legal Framework Order, 1970, issued by Gen. Yahya Khan
Legal Framework Order, 2002, issued by Gen. Pervez Musharraf.

Continuity of government in Pakistan